Typhon was a missile system developed by the United States Navy in the late 1950s, intended to serve as an integrated air-defense system for Navy fleets. Consisting of the SAM-N-8 Typhon LR, later designated RIM-50A, and the SAM-N-9 Typhon MR, later RIM-55A, paired with the AN/SPG-59 radar system, the cost of the Typhon system led to it being cancelled in favor of the Standard Missile program.

Design and development
Development of Typhon was initiated in the late 1950s, as the existing Talos, Terrier, and Tartar ("3 Ts") long-, medium-, and short-ranged missiles were considered to be approaching obsolescence; in the event of a mass attack by Soviet bomber forces, the requirement for each missile to have its own dedicated target illuminator would lead to rapid saturation of the defensive system. The Typhon system, developed under a contract awarded to the Bendix Corporation, would overcome this through the use of the AN/SPG-59 electronically scanned array radar system, capable of tracking and engaging multiple targets simultaneously.

The missile system to complement the radar was originally named Super Talos (long-range) and Super Tartar (short-range), but to avoid confusion with upgrades for the existing missiles was soon renamed Typhon. Typhon LR, the only version of the Typhon missile system to be test-flown, was ramjet-powered and capable of intercepting high-speed aircraft and missiles. A secondary capability in the surface-to-surface role, capable of targeting enemy ships, was also included in the specification. While primarily intended to be armed with a conventional high explosive warhead, Typhon LR was designed to be capable of carrying the W60 nuclear warhead.

It had yet to enter testing before the Typhon project was cancelled.

Operational history
In March 1961, the first test launches of the SAM-N-8 Typhon LR took place; beginning in 1962, the test ship  entered refit to install the Typhon Weapon Control System to allow at-sea tests to be undertaken. However, the expense of the Typhon system, combined with the technical issues encountered during development, led to the program being cancelled in November 1963. The conversion of Norton Sound was allowed to be completed to provide test data, with the ship recommissioning in June 1964; following the tests, the Typhon equipment was removed in July 1966. 

In lieu of Typhon, the U.S. Navy developed the Standard Missile family to provide air defense for the fleet, with the RIM-66 Standard and RIM-67 Standard ER missiles replacing Tartar and Terrier, respectively.

See also

Sea Dart

References

Citations

Bibliography

External links
RIM-50 Typhon at GlobalSecurity.org

RIM-050
Abandoned military rocket and missile projects of the United States
RIM-050
RIM-050
Nuclear anti-aircraft weapons
Bendix Corporation